Saint-Orens-Pouy-Petit is a commune in the Gers department in southwestern France.

Central to the commune is the classic Gers Pierre Blanche bastide of St Orens, consisting of a walled community on a fierce outcrop of rock, situated 2 km to the east of the D654 between Condom and Saint-Puy. St Orens has views to the south, including the Pyrenees in fine weather.

On a facing hill is the hamlet of Hameau de Pouy-Petit.

Saint Orens holds a Catholic church and the Château St Orens (sixteenth century). Hameau de Pouy-Petit has the Château gascon de Pouy-Petit (eighteenth century).

Geography

Population

Economy 
Agriculture
St Orens sits within of a large agricultural region, with common crops including corn, colza, sunflowers and grain. There are also a number of vineyards, producing grapes for wine or distilling.

Local market towns are known for their fine fruit and vegetables, particularly Condom, Nérac and Lectoure

Other products from local producers include:

 Armagnac brandy
 Côtes de Gascogne
 Floc de Gascogne
 Foie gras

Sites of interest 
   Fortified village walls (St Orens) - St Orens is enclosed by white stone walls (incomplete in sections) dating to the thirteenth century
   Château de St Orens (sixteenth century) - forming the western end of the fortified village, now containing the Salle de Fête (a function and exhibition space) and Mairie (mayor's office). The chateau was given to a lieutenant of the French gentleman soldier Blaise de Monluc, based in Saint-Puy.
   Château de Pouy-Petit (eighteenth century)
   Lavoir: a reconstructed washing area below St Orens, used by the villagers prior to modern plumbing
   Library
   Ceramics workshop and gallery
   Brocante
   Rare and vintage button shop
   Tennis court
   Boule patch

Arts
Like much of the Gers, St Orens had seen a slow period of decline through the twentieth century, leaving a number of properties in the village empty. An influx of newcomers and returnees in the 1970s and 1980s helped reverse this process. A number of these people were artists and artisans, creating a vibrant artistic community. The Salle de Fête regularly hosts arts exhibitions by local artists, and the nearby Musée d'Art Naïf (Béraut) complements this picture.

Flora and fauna
Observed around the bastide:

Mammals
Coypu, various deer species, wild boar

Birds
Barn owl, golden oriole, hoopoe, black redstart, kestrel, common buzzard, black kite, greenfinch, rock bunting, pigeon

Butterflies
Orange tip, European peacock, southern swallowtail, clouded yellow, small blue, white admiral, red admiral, painted lady, Queen of Spain fritillary

See also
 Communes of the Gers department
 Armagnac (province)
 Gascony

References

Communes of Gers